Bernhard Letterhaus (10 July 1894, Barmen – 14 November 1944) was a German Catholic Trade Unionist and member of the resistance to Nazism.

He grew up in Barmen, Wuppertal, and after an apprenticeship in a textile factory, he was an active member of the Association of Christian textile workers. He served in World War I and was then secretary of the Catholic Labour Movement in Mönchengladbach. He moved to Cologne where he was in contact with Nikolaus Gross, a fellow Catholic opponent of the Nazis.

He was conscripted into the Wehrmacht upon the outbreak of World War II. Upon posting to the OKW in Berlin he developed contacts with the 20 July plot conspirators including Carl Goerdeler's group. If the attempt to assassinate Hitler had succeeded he was earmarked to be the Reconstruction Minister. He was arrested in its aftermath, tried by the People's Court, sentenced to death by Roland Freisler and executed at Plötzensee Prison the next day.

Further reading
Jürgen Aretz: "Bernhard Letterhaus (1894–1944)". In: Rudolf Morsey (Ed.): Zeitgeschichte in Lebensbildern. Aus dem deutschen Katholizismus des 20. Jahrhunderts. Band 2. Mainz 1975.
Jürgen Aretz: "Letterhaus, Bernhard". In: Neue Deutsche Biographie (NDB). Band 14, Duncker & Humblot, Berlin 1985, S. 357 f. (Digitalisat)
Vera Bücker: "Bernhard Letterhaus". In: Karl-Joseph Hummel, Christoph Strom (Ed.): Zeugen einer besseren Welt. Christliche Märtyrer des 20. Jahrhunderts. Leipzig 2000
Ernst Kienast (Hrsg.): Handbuch für den Preußischen Landtag. Ausgabe für die 5. Wahlperiode, Berlin 1933, p. 357
Helmut Moll (Hrsg. im Auftrag der Deutschen Bischofskonferenz): Zeugen für Christus. Das deutsche Martyrologium des 20. Jahrhunderts. Paderborn u. a. 1999, 7., überarbeitete und aktualisierte Auflage 2019, Band I, pp. 382–385
Ludwig Rosenberg, Bernhard Tacke: Der Weg zur Einheits-Gewerkschaft. Hrsg. DGB-Bundesvorstand. Druck: satz + druck gmbh, Düsseldorf 1977

External links
Biography of Bernhard Letterhaus

1894 births
1944 deaths
People from Wuppertal
German Roman Catholics
Centre Party (Germany) politicians
Roman Catholics in the German Resistance
People from Bremen (state) executed at Plötzensee Prison
People executed by hanging at Plötzensee Prison
Textile workers
Executed members of the 20 July plot